WBZF, known as "Glory 98.5", is a radio station broadcasting an Urban Gospel format, licensed to Hartsville, South Carolina, and also heard on WYNN 540 in Florence, South Carolina.

History
WBZF played modern rock as "The Buzz" on 100.5 FM. Cumulus Media bought classic rock WHSC-FM 98.5, which moved to WMXT. WMXT's music moved to 100.5, and WBZF moved to 98.5. Later WBZF switched to gospel music.

References

External links
WBZF Official Website

Radio stations established in 1992
Cumulus Media radio stations
BZF